Baldara is a town in western India in Antah Tehsil in the state of Rajasthan. It is the administrative headquarters of the Gram Panchayat. As of the 2011 census, Baldara had a population of 3,198 people, 1,635  males and 1,563 females. The expected Baldara population in 2021-2022 is between 3,134 and 3,582 people. The literate population of the town is 2,097, of which 1,220 are males and 877 are females. People living in Baldara depend on multiple skills. A total of 1,409 workers are there, out of which 830 are men and 579 are women. A total of 221 cultivators are dependent on farming, out of which 191 are men and 30 are women. 160 people work in agriculture as laborers in Baldara, out of which 155 are men and 5 are women.

Geography 

Baldara is located 310 kilometers (193 mi) southeast of the state capital, Jaipur, and 32 kilometers (20 mi) northwest of Baran, at 25°14'39.18"N 76°17'12.44"E. The town is bounded on the east, north, south by Baran district & in the west by Kota district.

Some notable points about the same are as follows:

→ The Kali Sindh River passes through Baldara. 

→ Majare Sharif of Hajrat Dadaji Moulvi Sb is located in Kabristan Baldara.

→ Dargāh Sharīf of Hazrat Sufi Sayyed Mehmood Ali Shah Kanpuri Summa Baldari is situated between Jagapura & Basheerpura.

→ Late Haji Nihal Ahmed was another dynamic, social, political personality of Baldara. He was the Sarpanch of Baldara about 35 years. He was the social reformer of the society. He was also knows as "Sarpanch sab".

→ Late Haji Abdul Razzaq was one of the most dynamic, memorable, charitable personalities of Baldara. He contributed a lot to the village in the fields of education and agriculture. He helped the needy people of Baldara. He was also known as "Messiah of poor" & honorably "Bhaya Ji."

→ Molana Namdar Ahmed was a respected personality of Baldara. He was well known as 'Molana' and Qazi e Baldara.' And first Khalifa of "Sayyed Mehmood Ali Shah Sb." He was known for his well behavior and simplicity. He was strictly Panchghana Namazi and a well known social reformer.

→ Late Er. Rukhsar Ahamed Mahmoodi was another dynamic personality of Baldara. He was a well-educated, integrating, and a great well wisher of humanity.

'Rukhsar Ahmed Memorial and Charitable' was formed in remembrance of him. This trust works for education, poor, needy, orphans and many more welfare programs in the area.

Climate

The town has a tropical climate due to its proximity to the Tropic of Cancer with extremely hot summers.

The summer season in Baldara lasts from April to late October or November. The average temperature in the daytime is around 43 °C during this period. Winters are comparatively mild, with average temperatures being in the range of 26.7 °C (max) to 7 °C (min).

The average annual rainfall in Baldara is 885.6 mm. Most rainfall comes from the southwest monsoon beginning around the last week of June and lasting until mid-September. Pre-monsoon showers begin towards the middle of June with post-monsoon rains occasionally occurring in October. The winter is largely dry, although some rainfall does occur as a result of the Western Disturbance passing over the region.

Transportation 

Transportation in Baldara is provided mostly by unmetered taxis and bus services on main roads from Kota Airport to Baran. The town is located about 12 kilometers from National Highway 27, halfway between Kota and Baran. Antah station is the nearest railway station, located 12 kilometers from the town. It is a direct link of Kota-Beena railway line.

Divisions 

There are 5 sub-divisions and a village: Baldara, Roop-pura (Nayagaon), Sindhpuri, Sindhpuri-Fectory, Tikhod, Ganeshpura. Baldara is the center for FPS shops, banking, education, and a market for basic requirements. Baldara is also the Panchayat headquarters for all these villages.

Economy 

There are many sandstones, sand, and gravel mines in the Baldara. The town is the biggest producer of sandstone & fish in the district. Garlic, mustard, and wheat are the main crops grown here.

Other 

Railway stations near Baldara:
 Antah (12 km)
 Kota (60 km)
 Baran (22 km)

Schools Near Baldara
 Govt. Sec. School Baldara
 Govt. Sr. Sec. School Ratadiya
 Govt. Sr. Sec. School Anta
 Kendriya Vidhyalaya NTPC Anta
 Vivek Vardhini Sr. Sec. School Baran Road Anta
 Genius Public Sr. Sec. School Baran Road Anta

Colleges Near Baldara
 Mahatma Gopal Ram Mahavidhyalya Siswali Road Anta
 Vivek Vardhini College Baran Road Anta
 Govt. ITI NTPC Road Anta
 G.N. ITI Opp. Grain Mandi Anta
 Hadoti ITI Siswali Road Anta
 Aryabhatt ITI Siswali Road Anta

References 
https://www.indiagrowing.com/Rajasthan/Baran/Antah/Baldara
Villages in Baran district